Pecka is a village in central Croatia, in the municipality of Topusko, Sisak-Moslavina County.

History

Demographics
According to the 2011 census, the village of Pecka has 27 inhabitants. This represents 18.14% of its pre-war population according to the 1991 census.

According to the 1991 census,  98.31% of the village population were ethnic Serbs (233/237), 0.42% were ethnic Croats (1/237), and 1.27% were of other ethnic origin (3/237).

Sights
 Monument to the uprising of the people of Kordun and Banija

Notable natives and residents

References

Populated places in Sisak-Moslavina County
Serb communities in Croatia